This is a list of the first minority male lawyer(s) and judge(s) in each state. It includes the year in which the men were admitted to practice law (in parentheses). Also included are other distinctions such as the first minority men in their state to graduate from law school.

Firsts nationwide

Law school
First African American male law graduate: George Lewis Ruffin (1869)
First Chinese male to seek an American legal education: Sit Ming Cook (he was denied admission to a law school around 1878)
First Chinese male to graduate from an American law school: Hong Yen Chang (1888) (c. 1886)
First blind male law graduate: Josiah McIntyre (1889)
First Filipino American law graduate: Gonzalo Manibog (1917)
One of the first Cape Verdean-born Americans to graduate with a J.D.: Alfred J. Gomes (1923)
First Navajo male law graduate: Thomas Dodge (1924)
First African American male to enroll in a predominantly-White Southern university since the Reconstruction era: Silas Herbert Hunt (1948)

Lawyers 

First Jewish American male lawyer: Moses Levy (1778) 
First Native American (Choctaw) male lawyer: James McDonald (c. 1820s) 
First African American male lawyer: Macon Bolling Allen (1844) 
First African American male lawyer to win a jury trial: Robert Morris (1847) in 1848
First male lawyer of Czech descent: Augustin Haidusek (c. 1870) 
First deaf male lawyer: Joseph G. Parkinson (1880) 
First Turkish American male lawyer: James Ben Ali Haggin (c. 1880s) 
First Chinese male lawyer: Hong Yen Chang (1888) 
First Native American (Creek people) male admitted to practice before the federal courts: Albert Gallatin "Cheesie" McIntosh (1889) during the early 1900s
First Japanese American male lawyer: Masuji Miyakawa (1905) 
First African American deaf male lawyer: Roger Demosthenes O'Kelly (1908) 
First male lawyer of Filipino descent: Pablo Manlapit (1919) 
First Korean American male lawyer: Herbert Choy (1941)
First blind male lawyer: Leonard Staisey (c. 1950) 
First African American male lawyer in the U.S. Department of Justice's Civil Rights Division: Thelton Henderson (1962) 
First openly gay male lawyer: Harris L. Kimball 
First Hmong American male lawyer: Christopher Thang Tao (c. 1986) 
First Nepali American male lawyer: Khagendra Gharti-Chhetry (1987) 
First U.S.-educated Uyghur American male lawyer: Nury Turkel (c. 1990s) 
First undocumented immigrant male admitted to practice law in the U.S.: Sergio C. Garcia (2014)

Lawyers and the U.S. Supreme Court 

 First Native American male to practice before the U.S. Supreme Court: Elias Cornelius Boudinot (1856) during the 1860s
 First African American male to practice before the U.S. Supreme Court: John Rock (1861) in 1865
 First African American male to argue a case before the U.S. Supreme Court: Samuel R. Lowery (1874) in 1880
 First Native American (Omaha people) male to argue a case before the U.S. Supreme Court: Thomas L. Sloan (1892) in 1904
 First Chinese American male to practice before the U.S. Supreme Court: You Chung Hong (1923) in 1933
First African American male to argue and win a case before the U.S. Supreme Court: Charles Hamilton Houston (1924) 
First Latino American male to argue a case before the U.S. Supreme Court: Manuel Ruiz (1930) in 1952
First Asian American to argue a case before the U.S. Supreme Court: Benjamim Gim (c. 1949) in 1957
First Arab male to practice before the U.S. Supreme Court: Taher Helmy  in 1979
First deaf male to argue a case before the U.S. Supreme Court: Michael A. Chatoff (c. 1960s) in 1982
First Native American (Gila River Indian Community) male to win a U.S. Supreme Court case: Rodney B. Lewis (1972) in (1980)
First openly gay male to argue a case before the U.S. Supreme Court: John Ward in 1995
First male with cerebral palsy to argue a case before the U.S. Supreme Court: Randall M. Howe at around 2006
First undocumented male to argue a case before the U.S. Supreme Court: Luis Cortes Romero in 2019

Law clerks 

First African American male to clerk for a U.S. Supreme Court Justice: William Thaddeus Coleman Jr. (1946) in 1947
First Orthodox Jewish male to clerk for a U.S. Supreme Court Justice: Louis Henkin from 1946–1947
First South Asian male to clerk for a U.S. Supreme Court Justice: Vikram Amar from 1989–1990
First Hispanic American male to clerk for a Chief Justice of the United States: Ted Cruz (c. 1995) in 1996 
First blind male to clerk for a U.S. Supreme Court Justice: Isaac Lidsky in 2008

State judges
 First Jewish American male judge: Issac Miranda (1727) 
 First African American male justice of the peace: Wentworth Cheswell (1805)
First African American male judge: Macon Bolling Allen (1844) in 1847
First African American male elected as a county judge in the South since Reconstruction: James Dean (1884) in 1888
First Chinese American male judge: William "Billy" Heen in 1917
First African American male judge in the South since Reconstruction: Lawson E. Thomas (1923) in 1950
First Asian Indian-American elected male judge: Dalip Singh Saund in 1950
First Japanese American male judge in the contiguous U.S.: John Aiso (1941) in 1952 
First Chinese American male judge in the contiguous U.S.: Delbert E. Wong (1948) in 1959 
First Syrian Lebanese American male judge: Elias Shamon during the 1960s 
First openly gay male judge: Stephen Lachs (1963) in 1979 
First African American male elected as a probate judge: William McKinley Branch in 1970
First Filipino American male judge: Mel Red Recana (1974) in 1981
First Muslim American male judge: Adam Shakoor in 1981
First Samoan American male family court judge: Bode Uale in 1991
First African American male to preside over an American courtroom television show: Joe Brown in 1998
First openly gay male to preside over an American courtroom television show: David Young in 2007
First Hmong American male judge: Paul C. Lo (1994) in 2013 
First Zoroastrian male judge in the U.S. and California: Firdaus Dordi in 2017 
First openly bisexual male judge: Mike Jacobs in 2018 
First Palestinian American male judge: Abdel Majid Abdel Hadi in 2019
First Burmese American male judge: Bryant Yang in 2020
First Yemeni American male judge: Rashad Hauter in 2021

State supreme courts
First African American male: Jonathan Jasper Wright (1865) in 1870
First Japanese American male: Masaji Marumoto in 1956
First Japanese American male to become a chief justice: Wilfred Tsukiyama (c. 1924) in 1959
First Filipino American male: Ben Menor in 1974
First African American male to become a chief justice: Robert N. C. Nix Jr. (c. 1954) in 1984
First Hispanic American male to become a chief justice: Luis Rovira in 1990
First blind male (who was also Jewish):Richard B. Teitelman (1973) in 2002
 First openly gay male: Rives Kistler (1981) in 2003

Federal judges 
First Jewish American male (federal judge): Jacob Trieber in 1900 
First African American male (federal judge): William H. Hastie (1931) in 1937 
First Greek American male (federal judge/chief judge): Thomas Demetrios Lambros in 1967 and 1990 respectively
First Korean American male (federal judge): Herbert Choy (1941) in 1971 
First Asian American/Pacific Islander male (magistrate judge): Richard R. Komo in 1971 
First Japanese American male (federal judge): Shiro Kashiwa (1936) in 1972 
First African American male (chief judge): William B. Bryant (1939) in 1977 
First Filipino American male (federal judge): Alfred Laureta in 1978 
First African American male in the Deep South (federal judge): Robert Frederick Collins in 1978 
First Mexican American male (federal judge/U.S. Court of Appeals): Reynaldo Guerra Garza (1939) in 1961 and 1979 respectively
First Chinese American male (federal judge): Thomas Tang (1950) in 1977 
First Puerto Rican male (continental U.S.): José A. Cabranes (1965) in 1979 
First Native American male [likely Cherokee Nation] (federal judge): Frank Howell Seay in 1979 
First African American male to head a Deep South federal court: James Lopez Watson during the 1980s-1990s 
First Armenian American male (federal judge): Dickran Tevrizian (1965) in 1985
First Chinese American male in the contiguous U.S. (federal judge):: Ronald S. W. Lew (1971) in 1987
First Asian American/Pacific Islander male in the continental U.S. (magistrate judge): George H. King in 1987
First Native American male [Choctaw Nation of Oklahoma] (federal judge): Michael Burrage (1974) in 1994 
First Cuban American male (federal judge): Eduardo C. Robreno (1978) in 1992 
First Armenian immigrant male (federal judge): Samuel Der-Yeghiayan (1978) in 2003 
First Haitian American male (Article III): Raymond Lohier in 2010 
First openly gay male (federal judge): Joseph H. Gale in 2011
First openly gay African American male (federal judge): Darrin P. Gayles (1993) in 2014 
First Muslim American male (federal judge): Mustafa T. Kasubhai in 2018 
First South Asian American male (Article III in the Eleventh Circuit): Anuraag Singhal (1989) in 2019 
First Panamanian American male (Article III): Franklin U. Valderrama in 2020
First Muslim American male (Article III): Zahid Quraishi in 2021

Federal District court 

First African American male: James Benton Parsons (1949) in 1961 
First Chinese American male: Dick Yin Wong (1950) in 1975
First blind male: Richard C. Casey (1958) in 1997 
First Armenian immigrant male: Samuel Der-Yeghiayan in 2003 
First South Asian American male: Amul Thapar (1994) in 2007 
First Asian American male outside of the Ninth Circuit: Denny Chin (1978) in 2010 
First openly gay male: J. Paul Oetken (1991) in 2011

U.S. Court of Federal Claims 

 First Latino American male: Armando Bonilla in 2021

Federal Circuit Court 

First Chinese American male: Chuck Mau in 1950 
First Filipino American male: Ben Menor in 1968 
First Latino American male (U.S. Court of Appeals for the Ninth Circuit): Arthur Alarcón in 1979 
First Latino American male (United States Court of Appeals for the Third Circuit): Julio M. Fuentes (1975) in 2000
First openly gay male: Todd M. Hughes (1992) in 2013
First openly gay male (9th U.S. Circuit Court of Appeals): Patrick J. Bumatay in 2019

Bankruptcy Court 

 First African American male: Harry G. Hackett in 1954
 First Asian American/Pacific Islander male: Jon Chinen in 1976
 First Asian American male (of Chinese descent): Robert Kwan in 2007

U.S. Customs Court 

First African American male: Irvin Charles Mollison (1923) in 1945

U.S. Tax Court 

 First Latino American male: Juan F. Vasquez in 1995
 First African American male: Maurice B. Foley in 1995

U.S. Court of Appeals 

First Mexican American male: Reynaldo Guerra Garza (1939) in 1979
First African American male (U.S. Court of Appeals for the Sixth Circuit): Wade H. McCree (1948) in 1966 
First Japanese American male: A. Wallace Tashima (1961) in 1995
First blind male: David S. Tatel (1966) in 1994 
First African American male (U.S. Court of Appeals for the Fourth Circuit): Roger Gregory (1978) in 2000
First South Asian American male: Sri Srinivasan (1995) in 2013

U.S. Supreme Court 

First Jewish American male: Louis Brandeis (1878) in 1916 
First African American male: Thurgood Marshall (1933) in 1967

Judge Advocate General of the U.S. Army
 First Chinese American male: John Fugh (1960) from 1991-1993

U.S. Attorneys General 

 First Jewish American male: Edward H. Levi (1938) from 1975–1977
 First African American male: Eric Holder (1976) from 2009–2015
 First Hispanic American male: Alberto Gonzales (1982) from 2005–2007

Deputy Attorney General of the U.S. 

 First African American male: Eric Holder (1976) from 1997-2001

Associate Attorney General of the U.S. 

 First African American male: Wayne Budd from 1992-1993

Deputy Associate Attorney General of the U.S. 

 First Chinese American male: Nelson Dong (1974) from 1979-1980

Assistant Attorney General of the U.S. 

 First African American male: William H. Lewis (c. 1890s) in 1910

Civil Rights Division 

First Asian American male: Bill Lann Lee from 1997-2001 
First Latino American male: R. Alexander Acosta from 2003-2005 
First immigrant and Korean American male: Wan J. Kim from 2005-2007

Special Assistant to the U.S. Attorney General 

 First Chinese American male: Nelson Dong (1974) from 1978-1979

Solicitor General of the U.S. 

 First African American male: Thurgood Marshall (1933) in 1965 
First Asian American male: Noel Francisco (1996) in 2017

State Attorney Generals 
First African American male: Edward Brooke (1948) in 1962
First Native American male: Larry Echo Hawk in 1991
First Sikh American male: Gurbir Grewal (1999) in 2018

State Deputy Attorney General 
 First Chinese American male: Chuck Mau around 1936

United States Attorneys 

First African American male: Cecil F. Poole (1939) in 1961 
First African American male in the South since Reconstruction: Mickey Michaux (1964) in 1977
First Native American male (Sioux Indian): Terry L. Pechota (1972) from 1979-1981
First Chinese American male: Norman Bay (1986) from 2000-2001 
First Armenian American male: Richard S. Hartunian in 2010 
First Korean American male: B.J. Pak from 2017-2021

State Assistant District Attorney 

 First blind male: Leonard Staisey (1948) in 1950

State County Attorney 

 First Korean American male: John C. Choi (1995) in 2011

State Public Defender

 First Hispanic American male: Carlos J. Martinez in 2008

American Bar/Federal Bar Association (Presidents) 

First African American male nominated (since 1912): James S. Watson in 1943 
First Jewish American male: Bernard G. Segal in 1969 
First African American male: Dennis Archer from 2003-2004 
 First foreign-born male of Italian and Calabrian descent: Michael S. Greco from 2006-2007
 First Hispanic American male: Stephen Zack from 2010-2012 
First Native American (Pawnee) male to lead a national non-minority bar association ( Federal Bar Association): Lawrence R. Baca in 2009

State Bar Association (Presidents) 
First African American male: Wayne Budd from 1979-1980 
First African American male (elected): John A. Howard from 1981-1982
First openly gay male: Mark Johnson in 1998 
First American male of South Asian descent: Rajeev Majumdar in 2019

Firsts in individual states 

 List of first minority male lawyers and judges in Alabama 
 List of first minority male lawyers and judges in Alaska 
 List of first minority male lawyers and judges in Arizona 
 List of first minority male lawyers and judges in Arkansas 
 List of first minority male lawyers and judges in California 
 List of first minority male lawyers and judges in Colorado 
 List of first minority male lawyers and judges in Connecticut 
 List of first minority male lawyers and judges in Delaware 
 List of first minority male lawyers and judges in Florida 
 List of first minority male lawyers and judges in Georgia 
 List of first minority male lawyers and judges in Hawaii 
 List of first minority male lawyers and judges in Idaho 
 List of first minority male lawyers and judges in Illinois 
 List of first minority male lawyers and judges in Indiana 
 List of first minority male lawyers and judges in Iowa 
 List of first minority male lawyers and judges in Kansas 
 List of first minority male lawyers and judges in Kentucky 
 List of first minority male lawyers and judges in Louisiana 
 List of first minority male lawyers and judges in Maine 
 List of first minority male lawyers and judges in Maryland 
 List of first minority male lawyers and judges in Massachusetts 
 List of first minority male lawyers and judges in Michigan 
 List of first minority male lawyers and judges in Minnesota 
 List of first minority male lawyers and judges in Mississippi 
 List of first minority male lawyers and judges in Missouri 
 List of first minority male lawyers and judges in Montana 
 List of first minority male lawyers and judges in Nebraska 
 List of first minority male lawyers and judges in Nevada 
 List of first minority male lawyers and judges in New Hampshire 
 List of first minority male lawyers and judges in New Jersey 
 List of first minority male lawyers and judges in New Mexico 
 List of first minority male lawyers and judges in New York 
 List of first minority male lawyers and judges in North Carolina 
List of first minority male lawyers and judges in North Dakota 
 List of first minority male lawyers and judges in Ohio 
 List of first minority male lawyers and judges in Oklahoma 
 List of first minority male lawyers and judges in Oregon 
 List of first minority male lawyers and judges in Pennsylvania 
 List of first minority male lawyers and judges in Rhode Island 
 List of first minority male lawyers and judges in South Carolina 
 List of first minority male lawyers and judges in South Dakota 
 List of first minority male lawyers and judges in Tennessee 
 List of first minority male lawyers and judges in Texas 
 List of first minority male lawyers and judges in Utah 
 List of first minority male lawyers and judges in Vermont 
 List of first minority male lawyers and judges in Virginia 
 List of first minority male lawyers and judges in Washington 
 List of first minority male lawyers and judges in West Virginia 
 List of first minority male lawyers and judges in Wisconsin

Wyoming: Plasa L. Turner was an African American male lawyer that appeared in the Wyoming census (1910). His historical significance is unclear.

Firsts in Washington, D.C. (Federal District) 

 List of first minority male lawyers and judges in Washington D.C. (Federal District)

Firsts in the territories of the US
 List of first minority male lawyers and judges in the Territories of the US

See also 
 Lawyer [International]
 List of African American jurists [United States]
 List of Asian American jurists [United States]
 List of Hispanic/Latino American jurists [United States]
 List of Jewish American jurists [United States]
 List of Native American jurists [United States]

Other topics of interest 
 List of African-American jurists
 List of Asian American jurists
 List of Hispanic/Latino American jurists
 List of Jewish American jurists
 List of LGBT jurists in the United States
 List of first women lawyers and judges in the United States

References 

 
Minority, first
Minority, first